The 1982–83 season was Al Ain Football Club's 15 in existence and the club's 8th consecutive season in the top-level football league in the UAE.

Competitions

UAE Football League

League table

Matches

External links
 Al Ain FC official website 

1982–83
Emirati football clubs 1982–83 seasons